Pietà is a small town in the Central Region of Malta, located near the outskirts of the capital city Valletta. Pietà is the suburb next-closest to the capital after Floriana. Its name is derived from Italian and signifies "Pity."

Etymology
The name of Pietà in Italian means Pity.

Description

Malta's former national hospital, St. Luke's, is located in Tal-Pietà. Tal-Pietà is a coastal town, and an old boathouse of notable historic interest (now in use as a restaurant) is located on the waterfront. The town is named after a Church of Our Lady of Sorrows dating back to the 17th and 18th centuries which is still in active use today.

A couple of streets nearby bear the names of St. Augustine and his mother, St. Monica. Tal-Pietà was a departure point for the Gozo ferry before the construction of a yacht marina. The patrol boat depot of the Armed Forces of Malta is located at the Hay Wharf in nearby Floriana. Also within the boundaries of Pietà are St. Ursula's Orphanage; PBS, the national broadcaster; Villa Guardamangia, which served as the residence of then Princess Elizabeth of Great Britain (later Queen Elizabeth II), when she lived in Malta between 1949 and 1951; the Ta' Braxia Cemetery Complex is a Commonwealth War Graves Commission site and where many World War I garrison veterans from the British army and navy are buried; and the headquarters of the Nationalist Party. The party built its base here in 1969. Tal-Pietà is regarded as a suburb of Ħamrun, Msida, Floriana and Valletta. Most of its resident population over the past 50 years hails from this area.

The population of Pietà was 3,853 in November 2005, which had been an increase over previous years due to a new housing estate and the redevelopment of old homes over the past thirty years. In March 2014 the population stood at 4,020.

A large number of Maltese citizens have Tal-Pietà as their place of birth, because many women gave birth at St. Luke's Hospital. Tal-Pietà is not, however, considered by the Maltese born there to be their home town, that being considered instead the town or city they first lived in.

In August 2020, a group of enthusiasts formed the first band club in Tal-Pietà named Soċjetà Filarmonika Madonna ta' Fatima, Gwardamanġa - Pietà. The first General Meeting was in November 2021. By the first months, the band club had already nearly 100 members. The premises of the band club is at 231, Triq id-Duluri, Tal-Pietà,

Education 

 The secondary school for St. Augustine's College, run by the Augustinian Order

Administration
The current Pietà local council members are:

Keith Tanti (Mayor, PL)
Zoya Attard (Deputy Mayor, PL)
Anthony Camilleri (PL)
Josef Fitzpatrick (PN)
Annhelica Agius (PN)
Simon Cauchi (Executive Secretary)

Locations within Pietà

Zones in Tal-Pietà

Ta' Braxia
Xatt it-Tiben
Sa Maison
Gwardamanġa

Tal-Pietà Main Roads

 Misraħ San Luqa (St Luke's Square)
 Misraħ il-Madonna ta' Fátima (Our Lady of Fátima Square)
 Telghet Gwardamanġa (Gwardamanġa Hill)
 Triq ix-Xatt (Marina Street)
 Triq il-Mimosa (Mimosa Street)
 Triq San Luqa (St Luke's Road)
 Triq Santa Monika (St Monica Street)
 Triq San Guzepp (St. Joseph Street)
 Triq id-Duluri (Our Lady of Sorrows Street)
 Triq Zammit Clapp (Zammit Clapp Street)
 Triq Hookham Frere (Hookham Frere Street)
 Triq San Girgor (St Gregory Street)
 Triq is-Sorijiet tal-Ursolini (Ursoline Sisters Street)
 Sqaq Borton (Borton Lane)

References

External links

Our Lady of Fátima Parish Feast Commission

 
Towns in Malta
Local councils of Malta